Shelter is the second studio album by English folk musician Olivia Chaney. It was released on 15 June 2018, by Nonesuch Records.

Production
To write the album, Olivia went to an 18th-century cottage in North Yorkshire for inspiration. The album was produced by American musician Thomas Bartlett.

Release
On 13 April 2018, Chaney announced the release of her new album, along with the single "IOU". The music video was directed by Matthew Edginton.

Critical reception
Shelter was met with "universal acclaim" reviews from critics. At Metacritic, which assigns a weighted average rating out of 100 to reviews from mainstream publications, this release received an average score of 81 based on 9 reviews. Aggregator Album of the Year gave the release a 79 out of 100 based on a critical consensus of 9 reviews.

James Christopher Monger from AllMusic said: "Chaney's robust voice commands the room, deftly weaving between the intersecting lanes of vulnerability and raw power with remarkable poise, especially on standout cuts like "Dragonfly," "Roman Holiday," and "A Tree Grows in Brooklyn." Sarah Greene of Exclaim! said of the release: "Chaney's music draws from folk, classical and traditional music, and her songs have a contemporary vantage point that glances forwards and backwards in time. She moves with ease from nearly operatic to contemporary and casual and sounds equally at home" Hannah Jocelyn of The Line of Best Fit explained: "Shelter is a humble, somewhat sparse album that will captivate anyone who gives it the appropriate time. Stately but still emotionally resonant, it’s a masterclass in updating folk music."

Track listing

Personnel

Musician
 Olivia Chaney – primary artist, guitar
 Frank Harford – backing vocals
 Jordan Hunt – vocals, backing vocals

Production
 Thomas Bartlett – engineer, producer
 Patrick Dillett – engineer, mixing
 James Yost – engineer
 Greg Calbi – mastering

References

2018 albums
Olivia Chaney albums
Nonesuch Records albums